Saint-Germain-sous-Cailly (literally Saint-Germain under Cailly) is a commune in the Seine-Maritime department in the Normandy region in north-western France.

Its castle was the burial place of Ogier Ghiselin de Busbecq.

Geography

Population

Places of interest
 Ruins of a thirteenth-century castle.
 A seventeenth-century chateau.

See also
Communes of the Seine-Maritime department

References

Communes of Seine-Maritime